The Windsor and Annapolis Railway (W&AR) was a historic Canadian railway that operated in Nova Scotia's Annapolis Valley.

The railway ran from Windsor to Annapolis Royal and leased connections to Nova Scotia's capital of Halifax. The W&AR played a major role in developing Nova Scotia's agriculture and tourism industries, operating from 1869 until 1894 when it evolved into the larger Dominion Atlantic Railway.

The W&AR was formed by British railway investors and Nova Scotian railway promoters in 1864. Investors were attracted by the traffic potential to link Halifax with Bay of Fundy and New England ports as well as the apple orchards in the Annapolis Valley. The company's operations centre was in Kentville, although corporate headquarters remained in London, United Kingdom. The Windsor and Annapolis negotiated running rights over the government-owned "Windsor Branch" of the Nova Scotia Railway to connect Windsor to the city and harbour of Halifax. Vernon Smith, an experienced railway manager and engineer from Britain was the engineer in charge of construction and became the first general manager. The resident engineer was Henry Ernest Milner, also from England.
Construction began in 1866 with locomotives landed for work crews at Windsor, Wolfville, Nova Scotia and Kentville. The line began operation between Kentville and Annapolis Royal on June 26, 1869 while work continued on the line's two large bridges east of Kentville over the large estuaries of the Avon River at Windsor and the Gaspereau River at Hortonville. An official opening was celebrated on August 18, 1869 with dignitaries including Lord Lisgar the Governor General of Canada arriving by rail from Halifax, although shuttled over the uncompleted bridge works by stage coach. The devastating Saxby Gale on October 5, 1869 destroyed much of the newly built line between Hortonville and Wolfville which required hasty rebuilding. Despite these challenges, the railway opened for full operation on December 18, 1869 when the Avon and Gaspereau Bridges were complete and first train ran across the entire line from Halifax to Annapolis Royal.

The railway struggled at first with inexperienced staff, limited equipment and especially with extensive and ongoing repairs required on the sections of the line along the Minas Basin damaged by the Saxby Gale in 1869.  However passenger traffic quickly blossomed, helped by early tourism promotion of steamship connections to the emerging New England tourism market. Freight traffic began more slowly but an explosion in apple shipments in the early 1880s ensured the prosperity of the line.

The W&AR bought out the thriving branch line, the Cornwallis Valley Railway in 1890 which ran from Kentville to Kingsport through rich apple districts.

Merger and renaming

A formidable rival to the W&AR was the Western Counties Railway (WCR), based in Yarmouth, Nova Scotia, which used political allies to threaten the exclusive W&AR access to the critical "Windsor Branch" connection into Halifax.  However, the W&AR was able to buy out the WCR in 1894 to create the Dominion Atlantic Railway, thus providing a through line from Halifax to Yarmouth.  The W&AR set the direction for the new united company which took over the W&AR headquarters in Kentville as well as the W&AR's "Land of Evangeline" identity.

The Windsor and Hantsport Railway continued to operate over portions of the old Windsor and Annapolis mainline until 2011.

A monument to the Vernon Smith and his work constructing of the Windsor and Annapolis Railway was installed beside the line at the waterfront park in Wolfville in 2013.

References

 Gary Ness Canadian Pacific's Dominion Atlantic Railway (Vol. I), page 1 and (Vol. II), page 13.
 Marguerite Woodworth, History of the Dominion Atlantic Railway, 1937, p. 51-87.

External links
 "Windsor and Annapolis Railway" Canada By Train - Virtual Exhibit Library and Archives of Canada
  Ivan Smith "Significant Dates in Nova Scotia's Railway History (1850- 1899)" Railways of Canada Archives
 "Windsor and Annapolis Railway" Dominion Atlantic Railway Digital Preservation Institute
 "Windsor and Annapolis Line" New York Times February 11, 1894, Wednesday, p. 2
  Windsor & Annapolis Railway

Transport in Hants County, Nova Scotia
Transport in Kings County, Nova Scotia
Transport in Annapolis County, Nova Scotia
Transport in Halifax, Nova Scotia
Defunct Nova Scotia railways
Rail transport in Nova Scotia